Ivachino is a rural locality (a village) in Kubenskoye Rural Settlement, Kharovsky District, Vologda Oblast, Russia. The population was 121 as of 2002.

Geography 
Ivachino is located 21 km northwest of Kharovsk (the district's administrative centre) by road. Gora is the nearest rural locality.

References 

Rural localities in Kharovsky District
Kadnikovsky Uyezd